Josefin Bouveng (born 15 May 2001) is a Swedish ice hockey forward and member of the Swedish national team. She is signed to play college ice hockey with the Minnesota Golden Gophers women's ice hockey program in the Western Collegiate Hockey Association (WCHA) conference of the NCAA Division I as an incoming freshman for the 2022–23 season.

Playing career   
As a youth player, Bouveng played on the boy's junior side of Wings HC Arlanda.

She signed with Djurgårdens IF Hockey to begin her Swedish Women's Hockey League (SDHL) career in 2017. She put up 12 points in 33 games in her rookie SDHL season before improving to 26 points in 27 games in 2018–19, the most by an SDHL player under the age of 18. In the 2019–20 season, her point production dropped back down to 12, but she led the entire league in faceoff percentage.

She was due to move to North America to study at Princeton University and play with the Princeton Tigers women's ice hockey program beginning with the 2020–21 season, but the COVID-19 pandemic prompted her to postpone those plans. She opted to remain in Sweden and sign with Brynäs IF for the 2020–21 SDHL season instead.

International   
Bouveng made her debut with the Swedish national under-18 team at the age of 14. She won gold with the country at the 2016 Winter Youth Olympics and played in three IIHF U18 Women's World Championships, winning silver in 2018. On 19 January 2022, Bouveng was named to the Swedish team for the women's ice hockey tournament at the 2022 Winter Olympics in Beijing.

Career statistics

Regular season and playoffs

International

References

External links
 
 

2001 births
Living people
Brynäs IF Dam players
Djurgårdens IF Hockey Dam players
Ice hockey players at the 2016 Winter Youth Olympics
Ice hockey players at the 2022 Winter Olympics
Olympic ice hockey players of Sweden
Sportspeople from Uppsala
Swedish women's ice hockey centres
Youth Olympic gold medalists for Sweden
21st-century Swedish women